Play with Your Head is a studio album by Candy Butchers released in 2002.

Track listing
 "Worry My Dome" - 2:44
 "My Monkey Made a Man Out of Me" - 2:37
 "You Belong to Me Now" - 3:10
 "Ruby's Got a Big Idea" - 3:15
 "Tough Hang" - 3:41
 "Baby, It's a Long Way Down" - 3:53
 "It's a Line" - 3:43
 "I Let Her Get Away" - 3:03
 "My Heart Isn't in It" - 2:37
 "Make No Mistake" - 4:56
 "Call Off the Dogs" - 3:21

References

2002 albums
Mike Viola albums